The Johnson County Library (JCL), established in 1952, is the county library system for Johnson County, Kansas and includes 16 branches. As of 2013, it had 1,092,294 items. It lent 6,690,893 items in 2013. It serves a population of 598,555.

Branches 
The Johnson County Library consists of the Central Resource branch and 13 neighborhood branches.
 Antioch Library - 8700 Shawnee Mission Pkwy. Merriam
 Blue Valley Library - 9000 W. 151st St. Overland Park
 Cedar Roe Library - 5120 Cedar Roeland Park 
 Central Resource Library - 9875 W. 87th St. Overland Park
 Corinth Library - 8100 Mission Rd. Prairie Village
 De Soto Library - 33145 W. 83rd St. De Soto
 Edgerton Library - 319 E. Nelson Edgerton 
 Gardner Library - 137 E. Shawnee Gardner
 Leawood Pioneer Library - 4700 Town Center Dr. Leawood
 Lenexa City Center Library - 8778 Penrose Ln. Lenexa
 Monticello Library - 22435 W. 66th St. Shawnee
 Oak Park Library - 9500 Bluejacket Overland Park
 Shawnee Library - 13811 Johnson Dr. Shawnee 
 Spring Hill Library - 109 S. Webster Spring Hill

Marketing 

In June 2009, with the help of the Barkley Advertising Agency the Johnson County Library system implemented a unique marketing strategy.  The courier trucks the library uses to transport materials from one branch to another have been designed to represent some of the iconic individuals from literature from the angle of a product advertisement.

References

External links
 

Education in Johnson County, Kansas
Public libraries in Kansas
1952 establishments in Kansas
Kansas City metropolitan area
Johnson County, Kansas